The Suburban League is an Ohio High School Athletic Association (OHSAA) athletics league made up of 15 high schools from Cuyahoga, Medina, Portage, and Summit counties in Northeast Ohio.  It was formed in 1949 and expanded into two divisions in 2015.

Current members

Former members

Membership timeline

History
The Suburban League was established in 1949 by the larger high schools in the Summit County League. The original charter members were Copley, Green, Hudson, Manchester, and Northfield–Macedonia. In 1956, Highland joined for football only and competed for the '56 and '57 titles. The league expanded to nine schools in 1958 with the additions of Mogadore, Revere, Twinsburg Chamberlin, and Boston.

1962 saw two changes to league members as Northfield–Macedonia, which had been referred to as "Nor-Mac" or "Nor-Donia," became Nordonia, while Boston consolidated into the new Woodridge High School with Woodridge taking the place of Boston in Suburban League membership. Twinsburg Chamberlin left the league for the Chagrin Valley Conference in 1964, followed by Mogadore for the Portage County League in 1968, which dropped membership to seven schools for one season. Coventry joined from the Metro League in 1969 and membership returned to nine schools with Norton joining from the Metro League in 1972, but only for one year as Nordonia left in 1973 for the Metro League. League membership remained stable at eight schools for the remainder of the 1970s and into the 2000s despite several changes, beginning in 1976 when Manchester left the league for the All-Ohio Conference. They were replaced the same year by Highland, which had competed as a football-only member of the league in 1956 and 1957. In 1978, Woodridge left the league for the Portage County League and was replaced that year by Field, which joined from the Metro League. Membership again dropped to seven schools for one season after Coventry left in 1983, but Wadsworth joined in 1984 to return to eight member schools. The next change was in 1990 when Field left for the Portage County League and was replaced that same year by Tallmadge, which joined from the Metro League. Later that decade in 1997, charter member Hudson left the league after nearly 50 years to join the new Western Reserve Conference. They were replaced by Cloverleaf that same year.

During the early 2000s, the only changes in membership occurred in 2005 when Norton left the league to join the new Portage Trail Conference. They were replaced that year by Barberton, which left the Western Reserve Conference. Barberton's membership, however, ended up being brief and controversial. In early 2009, Barberton announced it would leave the league in 2011, with Barberton superintendent John Hall stating "we recognize our disagreements over athletics philosophies and approach must take precedence over league affiliation." He also added "We will become stronger by divorcing partners that never saw us as equals regardless of our successes.” There was also speculation that the league had asked Barberton to withdraw and that other changes were on the horizon for high school conferences in the area. Barberton left in 2011 and was replaced that year by Suburban League charter member Nordonia, which had been a member of the Northeast Ohio Conference (NOC). At the time of Nordonia's departure from the NOC, there were rumors that several NOC schools, particularly Stow–Munroe Falls, Hudson, Cuyahoga Falls, and Twinsburg, had expressed dissatisfaction with the structure of the conference.

Expansion and reorganization
The rumors of dissatisfaction with the NOC and other changes in high school athletics proved true and resulted in the largest changes for the league since it was established. In August 2013, charter member Green, which had played in the Suburban League for nearly 65 years, announced it would leave to join the Federal League in 2015.  Five days after the announcement from Green, nine schools—Aurora, Barberton, Brecksville–Broadview Heights, Cuyahoga Falls, Hudson, Kent Roosevelt, North Royalton, Stow–Munroe Falls, and Twinsburg—were asked to consider joining a newly-aligned Suburban League that would include divisions based on enrollment. Barberton, Kent Roosevelt, and North Royalton announced on September 16, 2013, they would join the Suburban League with Barberton and North Royalton beginning in the 2015–16 school year. Kent Roosevelt initially announced they would begin in the 2016–17 season, but later changed to 2015–16. Two days later on September 18, Aurora, Brecksville–Broadview Heights, Cuyahoga Falls, Hudson, Stow–Munroe Falls, and Twinsburg announced they would look to join the league in 2015–16. Later that year in December, Cloverleaf announced it would leave for the Portage Trail Conference (PTC) in 2015.

Cloverleaf departed for the PTC and Green to the Federal League after the 2014–15 season. Beginning in the 2015–16 season, nine new schools began Suburban League play along with the remaining six schools, with Barberton, Hudson, and Twinsburg returning to the league, and Aurora, Brecksville–Broadview Heights, Cuyahoga Falls, Kent Roosevelt, North Royalton, and Stow–Munroe Falls joining the league. With the influx of new members, membership rose to 15 schools and was divided into two conferences based on enrollment, with the eight larger schools in the National Conference and the seven smaller schools in the American Conference. In 2019, the league announced that beginning in 2021, Cuyahoga Falls would move to the American Conference, in spite of Cuyahoga Falls having one of the largest enrollments in the league. The switch was requested by Cuyahoga Falls in hopes of being more competitive.

After several years of trying to add a 16th member, the league announced in September 2022 that Solon High School would be joining for the 2023–24 school year in all sports, pending approval from their current conference, the Greater Cleveland Conference (GCC). GCC members approved Solon's departure for 2023–24 for all sports except football, citing difficulty in scheduling with seven teams. Solon is scheduled to begin Suburban League competition as part of the National Conference in all sports except football beginning in August 2023, with football joining the following season.

Notes

References

External links

Ohio high school sports conferences